Aloysius Maryadi Sutrisnaatmaka M.S.F. (born 18 May 1953) is an Indonesian Roman Catholic bishop.

Biography
On 6 January 1981 Harjosusanto was ordained a priest of the congregation of the Missionaries of the Holy Family. On 23 January 2001, Sutrisnaatmaka was nominated as the bishop of the Roman Catholic Diocese of Palangkaraya, and on 7 May 2001 he was ordained bishop by Julius Darmaatmadja.

References 

1953 births
Living people
Javanese people
People from Klaten Regency
21st-century Roman Catholic bishops in Indonesia